Gloria Scarsi (born 30 September 2000) is an Italian professional racing cyclist, who last rode for the UCI Women's Team  during the 2019 women's road cycling season.

References

External links
 

2000 births
Living people
Italian female cyclists
Sportspeople from the Province of Savona
Cyclists from Liguria